Satuni, or Sutuni (: Sa-tu-ni), was a king or prince of the kingdom of Lullubi c. 2270 BC. 

Satuni was defeated by Sargon's grandson Naram Sin, a defeat which is mentioned in the Victory Stele of Naram-Sin:

References

Middle Eastern monarchs
23rd-century BC monarchs